The Xallas is a river originating in smaller tributaries in Galicia, Spain close to Xallas.

The river passes by close to Santa Comba and flows through several barrier lakes (Fervenz, Ponte Olveira, Castrelo, Santa Uxia). The river flows into the Atlantic Ocean close to the town of Ézaro.

See also 

 List of rivers of Spain
 Rivers of Galicia

Rivers of Spain
Rivers of Galicia (Spain)